Chicago, Burlington and Quincy 5632 was a O-5b class 4-8-4 “Northern” built in the CB&Q's shops in August 1940. It was used to pull mainline passenger and freight trains before it eventually became famous for pulling a plethora of excursion trains for the CB&Q’s steam excursion program. By the time the program ended in 1966, No. 5632 was disassembled for an unfinished overhaul, and was subsequently sold to locomotive caretaker Richard Jensen. The locomotive was stored inside a roundhouse waiting for restoration until 1969, when it was illegally moved to a scrapyard. The locomotive derailed on a switch in 1972, resulting in its scrapping and a subsequent lawsuit between the scrapyard and Jensen.

History

Revenue service 
Between 1936 and 1940, the Chicago, Burlington and Quincy Railroad (CB&Q) constructed twenty-six O-5A class 4-8-4 "Northern" locomotives at the railroad's West Burlington, Iowa shops, and construction on No. 5632 was completed in August 1940. The O-5A locomotives were upgrades to the O-5 locomotives built by the Baldwin Locomotive Works in the early 1930s. No. 5632 was initially assigned to pull high-profile passenger trains and heavy freight trains throughout the Western portion of the CB&Q system; mostly throughout the states of Iowa, Nebraska, Wyoming, and Colorado. At some point in the early 1950s, No. 5632 became one of six O-5A’s to be converted to burn oil, as opposed to coal, and it was reclassified as an O-5B. After the CB&Q dieselized their entire passenger fleet on September 26, 1952, No. 5632 was among several O-5 class locomotives that were reassigned to haul freight extras in the CB&Q's Lincoln-Omaha divisions in Nebraska and Iowa. No. 5632 was one of the last steam locomotives to pull a revenue freight train on the CB&Q west of Lincoln, Nebraska, having pulled a train on September 17, 1955. The locomotive was subsequently put into storage in Lincoln, but in July 1957, all six of the O-5B's, including No. 5632, were removed from storage to pull additional freight trains in the Lincoln-Omaha divisions, in response to some diesel locomotives being transferred, in favor of that month's Nebraska wheat harvest.

Excursion service 
In late October 1958, No. 5632 travelled light from Lincoln to Chicago, Illinois, and on November 2, the locomotive was tasked to pull a railroad-sponsored reenactment fantrip of the "Aristocrat" between Chicago and Galesburg. Over 1,100 passengers were on board that day. In the wake of the success of previous steam-powered fantrips, the CB&Q's president, Harry C. Murphy, (a steam fan who recognized the popularity in steam locomotives) authorized the CB&Q to operate additional steam-powered fantrips within the coming years. No. 5632 subsequently pulled a few additional fantrips for the railroad throughout 1959. Beginning on June 7, 1959, the locomotive pulled a multi-day fantrip sponsored by the Illinois Railroad Club, with the train running from Chicago to Lincoln, and fellow O-5B No. 5626 would then be used to pull the fantrip from Lincoln to Denver, Colorado. Although, No. 5626 would suffer an eccentric rod failure enroute back to Lincoln, No. 5632 returned the trip to Chicago without incident. On September 6, 1959, No. 5632 pulled an eighteen-car fantrip on the CB&Q's suburban mainline from Chicago to Aurora, Illinois, and upon arrival in Aurora, 2-10-4 "Colorado" type No. 6315 was coupled in front of the O-5B for a doubleheaded run to Galesburg. While enroute to Galesburg, however, No. 6315 snapped an eccentric rod, and No. 5632 had to push No. 6315 while pulling the train solo for the remainder of the journey. 

Throughout the 1950s, twenty-one individual steam locomotives were used to pull the CB&Q's excursion trips, but by 1960, only two of them were still operational; No. 5632 and 2-8-2 "Mikado" No. 4960. At the end of 1960, No. 5632's flue time was nearing expiration, but after a flue inspection took place in Galesburg, the Interstate Commerce Commission's (ICC) Bureau of Locomotive Inspection granted No. 5632's flue time a one year extension. The ICC would grant the locomotive's flue time another extension in late 1961. Also in 1961, No. 5632 performed a doubleheader with No. 4960 on December 7, between Chicago and Galesburg. By the beginning of 1962, the CB&Q's passenger department proposed to create a new approach to market the railroad's steam program by promoting discount ticket sales to non-railfans. To that end, the railroad created a new set of excursion runs, entitled the Steam "Choo-Choo", which would carry and educate school students from various communities. No. 5632 pulled such trips beginning on April 30, and it subsequently pulled several more excursion trains for the remainder of the year.

Following the success of the 1962 excursion trips, the CB&Q hosted additional excursion trips for the Steam Choo-Choo events and the Illinois Railroad Club during the 1963 season. On August 26 and 27, No. 5632 ran for two days from Chicago to Denver to take part in that year's National Railway Historical Society (NRHS) Convention. The locomotive pulled a small series of excursion trips throughout Colorado, and during that time, it stopped in Longmont for a brief photo session with Great Western 2-10-0 “Decapod” No. 90. Two weeks after returning to Chicago, on September 29, No. 5632 returned to the West Burlington, Iowa shops, where it was built, in celebration for its twenty-third birthday. During the 1964 season, the railroad dwindled their steam excursion operations while the Steam Choo-Choo trips were discontinued; the CB&Q began to face critical financial and mechanical challenges in keeping their steam program going. In late May, during the 100th anniversary of the CB&Q suburban mainline between Chicago and Aurora, No. 5632 was painted in an all brass livery, and it pulled two commemorative trains on May 20 and May 23. The May 23 trip consisted of twenty-two cars, and 3,500 passengers were on board that day; the trip broke the record of the highest amount of people carried in a single train. No. 5632 retained the brass livery for the 50th anniversary of the opening of Kansas City’s Union Station on October 31 and November 1.

However, the November 1 trip also marked the last time No. 5632 operated under steam before its flue time expired; the ICC did not grant the locomotive any more extensions. As a result of public demand to keep the steam program going, Harry Murphy ordered for a class 3 overhaul to take place on No. 5632; the locomotive was moved back to the West Burlington shops for disassembly. A minimum of fourteen workers were required for the overhaul to be completed, but the CB&Q struggled to hire enough qualified personnel to work on the locomotive, since remaining veteran steam mechanics have retired and passed away. Harry Murphy retired from the CB&Q on July 1, 1965, and one of his final orders as president was for No. 5632’s overhaul to proceed. He passed away less than two years later following a heart attack at his home in Aurora. Harry Murphy’s successor, Louis W. Menk, had no interest in hosting steam excursion trains. While exploring ways to reduce operating costs for the CB&Q, Menk ordered for the steam program to be shut down by August 1, 1966 and for No. 5632’s overhaul to come to a halt.

Final years 
Chicago area railfan Richard “Dick” Jensen negotiated with Menk and other railroad management, and he succeeded to purchase No. 5632 in disassembled condition along with several boxcars full of spare parts directly from the CB&Q. He moved them to the Chicago and Western Indiana Railroad (C&WI) 47th Street Roundhouse outside of Dearborn Station in Chicago. Jensen had leased some stalls in the roundhouse from the C&WI to store his equipment, since he had become close friends with the C&WI’s president, Robert McMillan. Jensen had planned to continue where CB&Q crews had left off at rebuilding No. 5632 to return it to service, but he also planned to replace its tender with one from Illinois Central 4-8-2 “Mountain” type No. 2613. He relied on ticket sales from excursion trains hauled by Grand Trunk Western (GTW) 4-6-2 “Pacific” No. 5629 to fund the overhaul. However, in 1968, McMillan unexpectedly left the C&WI, and the new owners of the railroad began to consider demolishing the slowly-deteriorating 47th Street Roundhouse.

On February 27, 1969, the new owners of the C&WI sent Jensen a notice that stated he had until March 29 to vacate the roundhouse, but subsequent negotiations moved the deadline to June 1. While various people scrambled to remove all of their things from the roundhouse, Jensen and his crew were searching for a location to store No. 5632, as well as CB&Q 2-8-2 No. 4963, and considerations to move both locomotives to the Illinois Railway Museum (IRM) had came and went. In August 1969, the C&WI had No. 5632 moved with No. 4963 and all of Jensen’s boxcars full of locomotive parts and tools to the nearby 88th Street yard. Jensen had asked both the Chicago and North Western (C&NW) and the Chicago West Pullman and Southern (CWP&S) Railroads if an inspection was being performed on his locomotives and rolling stock, but their response was that the C&WI never allowed an inspection to take place.  

The following month, on September 25, the C&WI had illegally sold No. 5632, No. 4963, and the boxcars to the Erman-Howell division of the Luria Brothers Scrap Company for $5,800, and they were all moved to their 83rd Street scrapyard for storage. Jensen thereafter made an offer to re-purchase Numbers 5632 and 4963 from the company for their scrap value, but it was declined. In November 1972, No. 5632 was relocated within the yard, but in the process, the locomotive derailed as a switch it was on was traversed.  The crews at Erman-Howell had no easy way to perform the task of re-railing the locomotive, so they torched it right where it stood, and its remains were subsequently hauled to a nearby facility to be smelted down. When Jensen found out about No. 5632’s scrapping, he quickly filed a lawsuit against both Erman-Howell and the C&WI in early 1973. Several court sessions followed, one of which included Erman-Howell being required to bring several locomotive parts and tools from the boxcars to court. The C&WI later offered Jensen $6,000 of lost scrap value, but Jensen declined and asked for more. A subsequent offer of $150,000 was also declined. In 1981, twelve years after the illegal sale of No. 5632, and nine years after its scrapping, the court had ruled in Jensen’s favor and ordered the C&WI and Erman-Howell to pay Jensen $1.7 million, but for various reasons, he never received the full amount.  

As of 2023, the legacy of No. 5632 lives on with two CB&Q O-5A’s and two O-5B’s being preserved and on static display throughout certain parts of the United States.

See Also 

 Chicago, Burlington and Quincy 4000
 Union Pacific 844
 Milwaukee Road 261
 Grand Trunk Western 4070

References

Bibliography 

 
 

Chicago, Burlington and Quincy locomotives
Chicago, Burlington and Quincy Railroad
Scrapped locomotives
Individual locomotives of the United States
4-8-4 locomotives
Standard gauge locomotives of the United States